Astygisa is a genus of moths in the family Geometridae.

Species
 Astygisa circularia (Swinhoe, 1902)
 Astygisa furva (Warren, 1897)
 Astygisa metaspila Walker, 1864
 Astygisa morosa (Butler, 1881)
 Astygisa stueningi Holloway, 1993
 Astygisa subaurata Prout, 1928
 Astygisa theclaria (Walker, 1866)
 Astygisa vexillaria (Guenée, 1857)
 Astygisa waterstradti Holloway, 1993

References
 Astygisa at Markku Savela's Lepidoptera and Some Other Life Forms

Caberini
Geometridae genera